Watch is the eighth album by Manfred Mann's Earth Band, a studio album with two live tracks released in 1978. It is the first album recorded with new bassist Pat King, and the final album for both guitarist Dave Flett and original drummer Chris Slade. In West Germany, it stayed 69 weeks in the charts (# 3 highest position), receiving platinum status in 1981.

Track listing

Side one
"Circles" (Alan Mark) – 4:50
"Drowning on Dry Land/Fish Soup" (Chris Slade, Dave Flett, Manfred Mann) – 6:01
"Chicago Institute" (Peter Thomas, Mann, Flett) – 5:47
"California" (Sue Vickers) – 5:32

Side two
 "Davy's on the Road Again" (Live) (John Simon, Robbie Robertson) – 5:55
"Martha's Madman" (Lane Tietgen) – 4:52
"Mighty Quinn" (Live) (Bob Dylan) – 6:29

Bonus Tracks 1998 CD re-issue
 "California" (single edit) (Sue Vickers) – 3:46
"Davy's on the Road Again" (single edit) (Simon, Robertson) – 3:38
"Bouillabaisse"  (single edit) (Flett, Mann) – 4:02
"Mighty Quinn" (single edit) (Dylan) – 3:39

Personnel

The Earth Band
 Chris Hamlet Thompson – vocals, guitar
 Manfred Mann – keyboards, backing vocals
 Dave Flett – lead guitar, acoustic guitar
 Pat King – bass guitar, backing vocals
 Chris Slade – drums, percussion

Additional Musicians
 Doreen Chanter, Irene Chanter, Stevie Lange, Victy Silva, Kim Goddy – backing vocals

Technical
 Manfred Mann's Earth Band – producers
 Laurence Latham – engineer
 Rick Walton – engineer
 Edwin Cross – assistant engineer
 Michael Sanz – cover painting
 Pat King – photography

Charts

Weekly charts

Year-end charts

Sales and certifications

References

External links
 Manfred Mann's Earth Band - Watch (1978) album releases & credits at Discogs
 Manfred Mann's Earth Band - Watch (1978) album credits & user reviews at ProgArchives.com
 Manfred Mann's Earth Band - Watch (1978) album to be listened on Spotify

Manfred Mann's Earth Band albums
1978 albums
Bronze Records albums
Warner Records albums